Foshan Fosti Football Club was a Chinese football club, established on 1994. It was one of the earliest professional football clubs in China. The club was dissolved in 1997.

Name changes
 1988–1995 Foshan F.C. 佛山
 1996–1997 Foshan Fosti F.C. 佛山佛斯弟

Honours

League
Chinese Yi League
Champion (1): 1989

All-time league rankings

References

Football clubs in China
Defunct football clubs in China